The 1955 Nevada Wolf Pack football team represented the University of Nevada during the 1955 college football season. Nevada competed as a member of the Far Western Conference (FWC). The Wolf Pack were led by first-year head coach Gordon McEachron and played their home games at Mackay Stadium.

Schedule

References

Nevada
Nevada Wolf Pack football seasons
Nevada Wolf Pack football